Siek may refer to:
 Siek (landform), the name for a type of hollow common in parts of Germany
 Siek, Holstein, a municipality in Germany
 Siek (Amt)
 Sikh, historically also sometimes spelt Siek, a follower of Sikhism